INGKA Holding B.V. is a holding company based in Leiden, Netherlands. It is the holding company that controls 367 stores of the 422 of IKEA in 2018. The company is fully owned by the Stichting INGKA Foundation.

Relationship with other IKEA companies
Although it is the largest IKEA franchisee, INGKA Holding does not own the IKEA brand and associated trademarks; these are owned by Inter IKEA Systems in Delft, also in the Netherlands, which is the franchisor of the IKEA system and receives 3% of all IKEA revenues in royalties. Inter IKEA Systems is owned by Inter IKEA Holding, registered in Luxembourg, which is controlled, in turn, by Interogo Foundation, a Liechtenstein foundation that is also supported by the Kamprad family and is valued at approximately US$15 billion.

Ingka Centres 

The group's Ingka Centres division has developed several shopping centres in which IKEA is the anchor tenant, including the MEGA malls in Russia. Beginning in 2020, the division has acquired existing complexes which will be renovated to include urban IKEA locations, including Kings Mall in London, 6x6 in San Francisco, and the retail podium of the Aura condominium towers in Toronto.

Both malls are expected to open by 2025.

Other investments 

In September 2019, INGKA acquired an 80% stake in seven wind farms in Romania, purchased from the Danish wind turbine manufacturer Vestas. They are said to have paid $150.9m to the Danish firm through its investment unit.

References

IKEA
Establishments in Luxembourg
Companies based in Leiden